is an English contract law case, concerning the doctrine of consideration and promissory estoppel in relation to "alteration promises".

Facts
Mr Collier was one of three partners of a property developer. They had assented to a court order to pay £46,000 to Wright Ltd in monthly instalments of £600, and were jointly liable. From 1999 the payments went down to £200 a month. In 2000, Mr Collier swore that there was a meeting where Wright Ltd said he would be severally liable (for £15,600), rather than jointly (as a partner). The other two partners went bankrupt in 2002 and 2004. In 2006, when Mr Collier had finally made his payments (totalling exactly one third of the debt) Wrights served on him a statutory demand for the 'balance of the debt'. Mr Collier applied under rule 6.4 of the Insolvency Rules 1986 (because the debt was disputable on ‘substantial grounds’ (r.6.5(4)(b)); so he only needed to show there was a ‘genuine triable issue’ in which case the court would set aside the demand.

He alleged the variation agreement was binding, or if not that Wright Ltd was estopped from enforcing the full payment.

Judgment
The Court of Appeal reversed the judgment 'below' ('at first instance') on the promissory estoppel point.

Arden LJ held that Foakes v Beer applied, but referring to the ‘brilliant dictum’ of Denning J in High Trees, held that promissory estoppel could aid Mr Collier. Where he had been assured that he could repay only part of the debt, he had relied on the assurance by making his payments, Wright Ltd resiling from the promise ‘ itself be inequitable’.

Longmore LJ was more cautious than Arden LJ, confirming the need for some ‘meaningful reliance’ (after Rees), suggesting it was not a foregone conclusion that Wright's demand was entirely 'inequitable', but most importantly stressing the need for 'true accord'; stating:

Mummery LJ agreed, and stated that the appeal should be allowed because there was a prospect of real success on the "estoppel argument".

Significance

David Uff, instructed by Jai Ramsahoye of Betesh Partnership (for Collier) sought to carve out a third exception to Pinnel's Case (above and beyond Sir Edward Coke's own "the gift of a horse, hawk, robe etc. in satisfaction is good" and that established by Williams v Roffey) submitting that:

serving to illustrate the ongoing tension between Pinnel's Case/Foakes v Beer "doctrine" and that of promissory estoppel and the judicial reticence to displace/modify a doctrine that flowed from no less a man than Sir Edward Coke; some commentators seeing the case as leaving some doors open to side-stepping Foakes v Beer via promissory estoppel (formulated in High Trees). Others have criticized the judgment:-

Alexander Trukhtanov wrote:

Jill Poole suggests there was an implicit assumption that Williams could not apply in this context. She suggests that the importance of the case should not be exaggerated, relating only to a finding of an "arguable defence of promissory estoppel".

A mixed supporter includes:

Robert Pearce QC, who after highlighting the uncertainty as to whether the courts will follow the implications inherent in High Trees, D & C Builders v Rees and this case, specify "as a corollary, if there is 'true accord' [true later agreement], it will necessarily follow that it will be inequitable for the creditor to seek payment of the balance" going on to say:

See also

References

English contract case law
Court of Appeal (England and Wales) cases
2007 in British law
2007 in case law
English estoppel case law